Summer Schmit (born August 8, 2003) is an American Paralympic swimmer who represented the United States at the 2020 Summer Paralympics.

Career
Schmit made her international debut for the United States at the 2019 Parapan American Games, where she won a silver medal in the 200 metre individual medley and a bronze medal in the 100 metre breaststroke SB9 event.

Schmit represented the United States at the 2020 Summer Paralympics where she finished in fifth place in the 200 metre individual medley SM9, sixth place in the 100 metre butterfly S9 and seventh place in the 400 metre freestyle S9 events.

On April 14, 2022, Schmit was named to the roster to represent the United States at the 2022 World Para Swimming Championships. On June 16, 2022, she won her first World Championships medal, a bronze medal in the 400 metre freestyle S9 event with a personal best time of 4:51.47.

Personal life
Schmit was born with a congenital disarticulation of the right wrist and has no right hand.

References

2003 births
Living people
American female swimmers
Medalists at the World Para Swimming Championships
Paralympic swimmers of the United States
Sportspeople from Saint Paul, Minnesota
Swimmers at the 2020 Summer Paralympics
Swimmers from Minnesota
S9-classified Paralympic swimmers
21st-century American women